Tando Adam Junction railway station is located in Tando Adam city, Sanghar district of Sindh, Pakistan.

Services
The following trains stop at Tando Adam Junction station:

See also
 List of railway stations in Pakistan
 Pakistan Railways

References

External links

Railway stations in Sanghar District
Railway stations on Karachi–Peshawar Line (ML 1)